ORP Arctowski is a survey ship of the Polish Navy. Launched in 1982 in Poland, she is the lead ship of the Projekt 874 class, known as modified Finik class in NATO code. She is the sister ship of ORP Heweliusz. She is named after Henryk Arctowski, a Polish scientist and explorer.

In July 2006 the crew of the ship performed the positive identification of the wreckage of the German World War II aircraft carrier Graf Zeppelin.

References

Auxiliary ships of Poland
Ships built in Gdańsk
1982 ships
Survey ships of the Polish Navy